Vegan Outreach is a 501(c)(3) nonprofit organization founded in 1993. Originally known as Animal Liberation Action (ALA), the group was founded by Matt Ball and Jack Norris in Cincinnati, Ohio, in 1993.

History
As members of the animal rights community of Cincinnati, Matt Ball and Jack Norris (along with Phil Murray, now co-owner of Pangea Vegan Products) spent the winter of 1990–1991 holding fur protests outside cultural events. Their focus turned to vegetarianism in 1992, and the Animal Rights Community of Cincinnati funded the printing and distribution of 10,000 pro-vegetarian flyers entitled Vegetarianism. In June 1993, twelve activists—including Ball and Norris—held a three-day "Fast for Farm Animals" in front of a Cincinnati slaughterhouse. On the last day of the fast, some of the protesters took a large banner reading "Stop Eating Animals" to the University of Cincinnati campus.

Following this event, Ball and Norris formed Animal Liberation Action (ALA) and started a campaign of holding "Stop Eating Animals" banners on street corners. In 1994, ALA developed a booklet called And Justice For All. It focused on the reasons to adopt a vegan diet, focusing on the abuse of the animals involved. The following year, ALA's name was officially changed to Vegan Outreach.

Vegan Outreach partnered with restaurants, grocery stores, colleges and wholesale companies to guide them in adding plant-based options to their menus, shelves, and cafeterias.

Community outreach

Before the pandemic, staff and volunteers conducted outreach with the aim of signing people up for online guided vegan challenges. Community outreach took place on about 1,000 colleges and high school campuses each semester, as well as at vegfests, cat and dog festivals, Comic-Cons, yoga festivals, farmers markets, and other fairs and conventions worldwide.

Outreach involved free vegan food samples, showing virtual reality videos, and tabling booklets like What is Speciesism? and Why Vegan.

Online outreach

Outreach now takes place almost exclusively online, consisting of advertising on social media to interest people in vegan eating along with giving webinar presentations to college classes. This move proved to be effective with over 250,000 people signing up for Vegan Outreach's guided challenge, "10 Weeks to Vegan," in 2020, over 460,000 in 2021, and over 370,000 in 2022.

Programs

In 2022, Vegan Outreach reignited its Vegan Chef Challenge program. These are month-long events showcasing new vegan menu items at local non-vegan restaurants. Typically, 10 to 30 restaurants take part and the dining public is encouraged to vote for their favorite dishes. The challenges create a buzz about vegan food and receive local media attention. 

Vegan Outreach India has a prolific Green Tuesday Initiative campaign that works with institutions to add vegan options and decrease their animal product usage.

See also
 List of animal rights groups
 List of vegetarian organizations

References

External links

Vegan Chef Challenge website
Green Tuesday website

501(c)(3) organizations
Animal rights organizations
Animal welfare organizations based in the United States
Vegan organizations
Veganism in the United States